Francis Lucas  is the name of:
Francis Lucas of Bruges (1548/9–1619), Roman Catholic biblical exegete and textual critic from the Habsburg Netherlands.
Francis Lucas (Royal Navy officer) ( – 1770), naval officer and merchant trader born in Clontibret, Ireland
Francis Lucas (English politician) (1850–1918), British company director and Conservative Member of Parliament for Lowestoft 1900–1906

See also 
 Frank Lucas (disambiguation)